Kim Jong-ik (born 25 May 1949) is a North Korean boxer. He competed in the men's bantamweight event at the 1972 Summer Olympics.

References

1949 births
Living people
North Korean male boxers
Olympic boxers of North Korea
Boxers at the 1972 Summer Olympics
Place of birth missing (living people)
Bantamweight boxers